Laurentine may refer to:

 A person from Laurentum, a Roman town of ancient Latium
 Laurentine Hamilton (1826–1882), Presbyterian minister
 Laurentine idia or Idia laurentii, a moth in the family Erebidae

See also
 Laurentia